The 1981 Northwestern Wildcats team represented Northwestern University during the 1981 Big Ten Conference football season. In their first year under head coach Dennis Green, the Wildcats compiled a 0–11 record (0–9 against Big Ten Conference opponents) and finished in last place in the Big Ten Conference.  The team played its home games at Dyche Stadium in Evanston, Illinois.

Northwestern finished the season in the midst of a 34-game losing streak, the longest in NCAA Division I-A history. The streak began on September 22, 1979, and ended on September 25, 1982.

The team's offensive leaders were quarterback Mike Kerrigan with 1,317 passing yards, Jim Browne with 162 rushing yards, and Chris Hinton with 265 receiving yards. Ricky Edwards led the Big Ten with 30 kickoff returns and 611 kickoff return yards.

Schedule

Roster

References

Northwestern
Northwestern Wildcats football seasons
College football winless seasons
Northwestern Wildcats football